Two Mothers is a 1916 American silent short film directed by Lloyd B. Carleton. The film is based on a story by I.A.R. Wylie. Calder Johnstone developed the adaptation for the screen. The drama's features Dorothy Davenport, Alfred Allen and Emory Johnson.

Nina Angus is an opera singer. She is the lone support for a disabled husband and a 12-year-old boy. The leading part in a famous opera opens up for auditions. Nina is one of two finalists for the role. Her competition is a well-known singer who is the ex-wife of her husband. Conflicting background stories emerge stirring up deep emotions in both women, but they resolve their issues to make for a happy ending.

The film was released on June 1, 1916, by Universal.

Plot
The Grand Opera house has staged a production of Carmen. They have yet to select a Prima Donna for the role of the gypsy girl, Carmen. The leading role has called out for auditions. When the tryouts finish, only two women remain Nine Angus and Violetta Andree.

Some years ago, Nina Angus married Richard Angus. Nina's husband had a son from a previous marriage, Richard (Dick) Angus Jr., and the couple has raised the 12-year-old boy as their own. Richard has a disability, and Nina provides the sole support for the family. Their finances have taken a turn for the worst, and the family depends on Nina securing this job. Recently, Nina has struggled to find work. Nina returns home to relax after experiencing another grueling day of auditions. The family has dinner together, and after Dick goes to bed, Nina has a serious talk with her husband. Nina mentions she only has one serious rival she must outperform. The problem, Nina admits, is her competition is more accomplished and can sing better than she. She explains her rival's name to be none other than Violetta Andree, the ex-wife of Richard and Dick's birth mother. Violetta is a local favorite in town, and her engagement book is seldom empty.

Richard reveals to Nina the reason he and Violetta divorced so many years ago. He tells Nina that Violetta was a flirt and always in the company of men. He said in the end; she had abandoned him, her home, and her child. Richard had no choice but to seek a divorce. Nina believed Richard's story, and the two commiserated together. Richard retires early. Later that evening, there is a knock on the door, and when Nina opens the door, Violetta is standing on the porch. She wants to talk about her 12-year-old son.

Violetta feels now that she is successful, she would like to gain full guardianship of her son. Knowing Nina and the family are financially strapped, she offers many inducements. Violetta finally offers to feint illness, thus giving the part of Carmen to Nina if she will give up custody of the boy. Nina still trusts her husband's description of Violetta's home-wrecking past. She refuses! Nina tells Violetta, she is the only mother Richard Jr. has ever known. She couldn't give him up now, especially with Violetta's history.

Violetta seems puzzled when Nina explained her reasoning for maintaining custody. She asks what Richard Sr. had told Nina of their previous circumstances. Now we find out the other side of the story. Violetta claims Richard Sr. was a heavy drinker, and she supported him for years. Then she met a man who sympathized with her plight, and they became fast friends. Richard Sr. became insanely jealous of their friendship and the man's wealth. He demanded a divorce. She sacrificed everything, including her son, to marry her current husband and continue her career.

Nina pondered over the sacrifices she had made, supporting her disabled husband and taking care of her stepson. She further reflected on the wrong influence she thought the boy's birth mother would have on him before discovering the actual truth. Nina has life-changing choices before her. The following evening, Violetta is sitting in her dressing room. A call-boy stops in and hands her a card. The card is a request from Mr. Richard Angus stating he would like to see her before the show's start. She tells the call-boy to escort him in.

A 12-year-old boy walks into her dressing room wearing a well-used evening suit. It occurred to Violetta that Mr. Richard Angus might be Mr. Richard Angus Jr., her son. Dick pleads with Violetta to let his mom have the part of Carmen. The young man knows his family is suffering and how desperately his mother needs this job. They chat awhile longer, and Dick tells Violetta that Nina became his step-mom when his birth mother had died. Dick reaches in his pocket and pulls out an old worn photograph. The picture is of Dick and a very young woman–Violetta. Violetta understands Dick does not know that she is his birth mother. Emotions overcome Violetta and she kisses the young man on the forehead. She decides for the sake of the boy, she will not disclose her true identity.

Violetta asks Dick to return to his mother, and she will see what she can do to help. After the boy leaves, she calls her husband. She says he must develop a means to support the Angus family financially. He agrees to do so. Then she calls the manager and notifies him she is too ill to perform. She suggests the manager call Nina Angus.

Cast
{| class="wikitable"
! Actor
! Role
|- style="text-align: left;"
|Dorothy Davenport||Violetta Andree
|-
|Emory Johnson||Violetta's Second Husband
|-
|Alfred Allen||Richard Angus
|-
|Gordon Griffith||Dick Angus, the son of Richard
|-
|Virginia Southern||Nina Angus
|}

Production

Pre-production

Development
According to the book - The Universal Story, Carl Laemmle (-1939) produced around 91 movies in 1916.
Lloyd B. Carleton (–1933) started working for Carl Laemmle in the Fall of 1915. Carleton arrived with impeccable credentials, having directed some 60 films for the likes of Thanhouser, Lubin, Fox, and Selig. 
Between March and December 1916, 44-year-old Lloyd Carleton directed 16 movies for Universal, starting with The Yaqui and ending with The Morals of Hilda. Emory Johnson acted in all 16 of these films. Of Carleton's total 1916 output, 11 were feature films, and the rest were two-reel shorts.

In 1916, Carleton directed all 13 films pairing Dorothy Davenport and Emory Johnson. This film would be the fourth in the 13-film series. These totals show Carl Laemmle was clearly giving the Davenport-Johnson pairing one of his elite directors from the working cadre of universal directors to produce the screen chemistry Laemmle was seeking.

Casting
Dorothy Davenport (1895-1977) was an established star for Universal when the  year-old actress played Violetta Andree. She had acted in hundreds of movies by the time she starred in this film. The majority of these films were 2-reel shorts, as was the norm in Hollywood's teen years. She had been making movies since 1910. She started dating Wally Reid when she was barely 16, and he was 20. They married in 1913. After her husband died in 1923, she used the name "Mrs. Wallace Reid" in the credits for any project she took part in. Besides being an actress, she would eventually become a film director, producer, and writer.
Emory Johnson (1894-1960) was  years old when he acted in this movie as Violetta's Second Husband. In January 1916, Emory signed a contract with Universal Film Manufacturing Company. Carl Laemmle of Universal Film Manufacturing Company thought he saw great potential in Johnson, so he chooses him to be Universal's new leading man. Laemmle's hope was Johnson would become another Wallace Reed. A major part of his plan was to create a movie couple that would sizzle on the silver screen. Laemmle thought Dorothy Davenport and Emory Johnson could create the chemistry he sought. Johnson and Davenport would complete 13 films together. They started with the successful feature production of Doctor Neighbor in May 1916 and ended with The Devil's Bondwoman in November 1916. After completing the last movie, Laemmle thought Johnson did not have the screen presence he wanted. He decided not to renew his contract. Johnson would make 17 movies in 1916, including 6 shorts and 11 feature-length Dramas. 1916 would become the second-highest movie output of his entire acting career. Emory acted in  25 films for Universal, mostly dramas with a sprinkling of comedies and westerns.
Alfred Allen (1866-1947) was  years old when he was selected to play Richard Angus. Allen was highly educated, had a commanding presence and stood six feet, and weighed two hundred pounds. He got his start in the film industry at Universal city in 1913.  He landed his first role in 1915. His roles were character parts, and he played mostly fathers, villains, or ranch owners. Alfred Allen appeared in 69 features from 1916 through 1929. After heartaches he would appear in four more Davenport-Johnson projects: A Yoke of Gold, The Unattainable, The Human Gamble and Barriers of Society.
Gordon Griffith (1907-1958) was  years old when he played the role of a 12-year-old boy named Richard (Dick) Angus. He was one of the first child actors in the American movie industry. He was already an experienced actor by the age of seven. He was born on July 4, 1907, in Chicago, Illinois.

Screenplay
The story was created by Ida Alexa Ross Wylie better known as I. A. R. Wylie (1885–1959). She was 
 years old when this movie was released based on a story she had published in the Saturday Evening Post. Wylie's writing career had taken off while she was still in her teens.  Her first novel was adapted for the screen in 1915 and 4  more adaptations would follow before 1921.
Over 30 movies were made between 1915 and 1953 were based on her works.

The screenplay was developed by Calder Johnstone (1880-1958) who started writing scenarios in 1914. Johnstone (1880–1958) was  years old when this film was released. He would go on to write the scenario for the next Davenport-Johnson vehicle Her Soul's Song released on June 15, then write the adaptation for A Yoke of Gold and both the story and adaptation for The Human Gamble.

Filming
The April 22, 1916 edition of Motion Picture News states:
The Lloyd B. Carleton Company has just completed the filming of Her Husband's Faith and this company will next take up the filming of The Other Woman, a story which pertains to the musical world.
The April 22 article indicates a filming timetable for this movie:
Filming started in mid-April 1916 and continued through May, wrapping up before the copyright date of May 24, 1916.

Alternate title
In the May 6, 1916 issue of The Moving Picture World we see a reference to the film, ‘’The Other Women.’’ This title is the working title before the film was retitled to ‘’Two Mothers.’’

Post production

Based on an American Film Institute standard, films with a running time of forty minutes or longer are considered feature films.

By 1915, feature films were starting to become more the trend in Hollywood. While advertising this film, a Universal ad is shown in the graphic, also expounds on short films.
The moving picture business is here to stay. That you must admit despite carping critics and blundering sore-heads. True, some exhibitors have found business so good lately — but if you get down to facts when you look for the reason why, it's a 100 to 1 shot that they are, and for some time have been, dallying with a feature program. Some of these wise ones will tell you that business has picked up since they went into features, — BUT — ask them whether they are talking NET or GROSS. They will find they have an immediate appointment and terminate your queries unceremoniously. Funny how we like to kid ourselves, isn't it? The man who is packing 'em in and losing money on features is envied by his competitor, who is laying by a bit every day, and has a good steady, dependable patronage but admits to a few vacant seats at some performances. When this chap wakes up, he will realize that he has a gold mine and that good advertising will make it produce to capacity. The moral is that if you can tie up to the Universal Program, DO IT. If you can't NOW, watch your first chance. Let the people know what you have, and let the feature man go on to ruin if he wants to. You should worry!

Studios
The movie was filmed at the studio complex at Universal Studios located at 100 Universal City Plaza in Universal City, California.

Release and reception

Official release
The copyright was filed with U.S. Copyright Office and entered into the record as shown:
Two Mothers. Laemmle. 1916. 2 reels.
Credits:Producer, Lloyd Carleton; story,
I.A.R. Wylie; scenario, Calder Johnstone.
© Universal Film Mfg. Co.,Inc.;24May16;
LP8348

This film was officially released on June 1, 1916.

Advertising
In 1916, movie companies spent more advertising dollars marketing feature films than promoting short films.  A brief synopsis along with release dates was the norm for a short film while reserving the full-page ads for features. Universal recommended short films should be shown in conjunction with other short films to create a "diversified program."

The newspaper ad showing Two Mothers playing along with one other film. The other film was Ernest Shields, Harry Todd and his wife Margaret Joslin starring in the two-reel comedy production of It Can't Be True.

Referencing "The Universal Program" detailed above, this is an example of a "diversified program."

Reviews
Lengthy detailed reviews for short films were uncommon. The Hollywood magazines primarily reviewed feature films and only gave short films honorable mention. Of course, in 1916, movie magazines were evolving and becoming more sophisticated like the movies they checked and advertised.

Critical response
In the May 6, 1916 issue of The Moving Picture World, Robert C. McElravy states:

Certain unusual features of plot and presentation render this an appealing two-reel number, not so much from any extravagance of setting but because the main situation is quite original. It is the story of a man who married two operatic stars. . . Dorothy Davenport handles the part of Violetta in an appealing manner, obtaining considerable pathos in the latter scenes.

In the June 3, 1916 issue of the Motion Picture News, the review observes:
This is a most unusual feature of life on the operatic stage, constructed in the original style and worked out effectively.

Preservation status

A report created by film historian and archivist David Pierce for the Library of Congress claims:
75% of original silent-era films have perished.
14% of the 10,919 silent films released by major studios exist in their original 35mm or other formats.
11% survive in full-length foreign versions or on film formats of lesser image quality. Many silent-era films did not survive for reasons as explained on this Wikipedia page.

Since no records detail this film's status, it is presumed all copies of this film are lost.

Gallery

References

External links

Katchmer, George A. A Biographical Dictionary of Silent Film Western Actors and Actresses, McFarland, 2002, p. 204.
Holmstrom, John. The Moving Picture Boy: An International Encyclopaedia from 1895 to 1995, Norwich, Michael Russell, 1996.
List of Universal Pictures films (1912–1919)
Universal Pictures
List of American films of 1916

1916 lost films
1916 drama films
1916 films
American black-and-white films
American silent short films
1910s English-language films
Lost American films
Silent American drama films
Universal Pictures short films
Films directed by Lloyd B. Carleton
1910s American films